José Gabriel da Costa, later known as Mestre Gabriel, (1922–1971), is the founder of the União do Vegetal, a Christian religious sect that considers Hoasca (more commonly referred to as "ayahuasca") to be its main sacrament. This beverage is made by boiling two plants, Mariri (Banisteriopsis caapi) and Chacrona (Psychotria viridis), both of which are found in the Amazon rainforest.

Mestre Gabriel was born on February 10 in Coração de Maria, in the state of Bahia, Brazil.  He received minimal education and moved to  Acre, Brazil, later becoming a rubber tapper in the Amazon region.  It was through his work as a rubber tapper that Mestre Gabriel first encountered Hoasca; receiving what he believed to be revelations, he created the UDV on July 22, 1961, on the border between Brazil and Bolivia, organizing a coherent belief system and gathering the first few followers. 

After some years Mestre Gabriel left the forest and moved with his family to Porto Velho, the capital of the Guaporé territory (which would later become the state of Rondônia, Brazil) easing access to and expansion of the UDV. There the religious institution was formally registered on November 1st, in the year of 1967. Mestre Gabriel died on September 24, 1971, in Brasília, DF. By then he had already prepared a group of disciples who united, carry on and distribute the spiritual knowledge taught by Mestre Gabriel. Today the UDV has spread through the Brazilian Amazon and urban areas of the country, being present in all Brazilian capitals. The UDV is also present in numerous other countries such as the USA, Canada, Spain, Switzerland, Australia and others.

References

External links
 History of the UDV and Mestre Gabriel
 UDV official website

1922 births
1971 deaths
Brazilian religious leaders
Psychedelic drug advocates
Religious syncretism in Brazil